Baliesthes alboguttatus is a species of beetle in the family Cerambycidae, and the only species in the genus Baliesthes. It was described by Fairmaire in 1885.

References

Tragocephalini
Beetles described in 1885